Turret may refer to:
 Turret (architecture), a small tower that projects above the wall of a building
 Gun turret, a mechanism of a projectile-firing weapon
 Objective turret, an indexable holder of multiple lenses in an optical microscope
 Missile turret, a device for aiming missiles towards their intended target before launch
 The Turret, a headland in Antarctica
 Trading turret, a specialised telephony key system
 Turret (anatomy), an element of the anatomy of a turret sponge
 Turret (character), a character in the television series Dino-Riders
 Turret (electronics), an element of a turret board that is soldered to electronic components to complete a circuit layout
 Turret (superstructure), an element in the design of turret deck ships
 Turret (toolholder), an indexable holder of multiple tools
Turret lathe, a lathe with a turret toolholder
 Turret (Hadrian's Wall), one of a series of watchtowers

See also
 It-Turretta (disambiguation)
 Tourette (disambiguation)